Poppy Gilbert (born 14 September 1998) is a British actress. She is known for roles as Barbie in the Netflix series Stay Close (2021), Chloe (2022), and The Catch in 2023.

Early life and education
Gilbert was born in Stockholm, Sweden to British parents Nigel and Camilla and moved around between London, Hong Kong, and Singapore growing up due to her parents' work in advertising and television respectively. She has a sister Darcy.

Gilbert attended Lady Eleanor Holles School in Hampton from 2008 to 2015. She participated in a number of school productions. At the age of 17, Gilbert joined the National Youth Theatre, and in 2016, she began her studies at the Guildhall School of Music & Drama, graduating in 2019 with a Bachelor of Arts in Acting.

Career
Gilbert made her television debut in 2020 as Lesley Pike in an episode of Call the Midwife season nine, which she filmed during her final year of drama school. She played Thomasina Tucker in the two-part adaptation of Agatha Christie's The Pale Horse, and as Ginevra de Benci in three episodes of the historical drama Leonardo starring Aidan Turner as Leonardo da Vinci.

At the end of 2021, Gilbert appeared in Harlan Coben's Netflix mystery series Stay Close as the pseudonymous killer Barbie opposite Hyoie O'Grady as Ken. She then starred in the 2022 BBC One psychological thriller Chloe as the title character. Gilbert also appeared as the young Julie Jackson in two episodes of BBC One's Sherwood in June 2022.

Gilbert starred as Abbie in the Channel 5 series The Catch in January 2023, alongside Jason Watkins and Aneurin Barnard.

Filmography

References

External links

Poppy Gilbert Instagram

Living people
1998 births
Actresses from London
Actresses from Stockholm
National Youth Theatre members
Alumni of the Guildhall School of Music and Drama
British expatriates in Hong Kong
British expatriates in Singapore
British expatriates in Sweden
English stage actresses
English television actresses
People educated at Lady Eleanor Holles School
People from Putney